Wolf It is a British television series produced by Scottish Television and broadcast on CITV for 4 series between 1993 and 1996. The show is a spin off from the Saturday morning television series What's Up Doc? and features Bro and Bro, two English wolves who featured regularly in the aforementioned show. The programme was filmed in and around the Maidstone television studios, where it was also set, with Bro & Bro having set up home in a film vault.

The wolves called each other "Bro". Their real names were never heard, as there was always some noise which would mask whatever was being said by any person who was saying their names at the time.

The show replaced Rolf's Cartoon Club, and like the previous show, also showed cartoons, all from the Looney Tunes and Merrie Melodies series, which ITV owned the rights to at the time, 2 shorts were shown each episode.

Bro and Bro were voiced by Don Austen and John Eccleston. Despite Eccleston's shoes being filled on the original What's Up Doc? (series 3 onwards) by Dave Chapman, best known perhaps for portraying Otis the Aardvark as well as multiple characters on Dick and Dom in Da Bungalow. Eccleston continued to perform his character for subsequent series of Wolf It!

Series 3 and 4 were known as Wolf It: The Next Generation.

Releases
In 1994, a video was released containing 4 episodes from the first series, albeit without the cartoon shorts. However, apart from this, there have been no further releases, and the episodes have not been rerun.

Trivia
Eccleston and Austen have been frequent collaborators, also working together as Sage & Onion- puppet leprechauns on BBC Saturday Morning show Live & Kicking, Iver & Groove on pre-school programme The Hoobs and Scratch and Sniff on ITV Saturday Morning show Ministry of Mayhem and spin-off Scratch & Sniff's Den of Doom.

Transmission guide
Series 1: 13 editions from 4 November 1993 – 10 February 1994
Series 2: 12 editions from 21 September 1994 – 7 December 1994
Renamed Wolf it - The Next Generation
Series 3: 8 editions from 23 August 1995 – 11 October 1995
Series 4: 4 editions from 28 August 1996 – 18 September 1996

1990s British children's television series
1993 British television series debuts
1996 British television series endings
British children's comedy television series
British television shows featuring puppetry
English-language television shows
ITV children's television shows
Television series about wolves
Television series by ITV Studios
Television shows produced by Scottish Television